La Réole is a commune in the Gironde department in Nouvelle-Aquitaine in southwestern France.

Geography
La Réole station has rail connections to Agen, Langon and Bordeaux.

History
There is evidence of a Roman villa, La Pontesa, with an adjoining cemetery which has been dated to be from the 3rd or 4th century. There were other Roman villas nearby. At this time in the region, there were Roman buildings every kilometre and a half or so.

Evidence of later dwellings on the La Pontesa site show that it was inhabited between the 7th and 8th centuries. Nineteen sarcophaguses and funeral articles have been found on this site.

La Réole grew up round a monastery founded in the 7th or 8th century, which was reformed in the 11th century and took the name of Regula, whence that of the town. During the Middle Ages, La Réole was a royal town, administered by six jurats (pre-revolution municipal officers), who were elected by the town's bourgeois. The law was upheld in the name of the King. During a significant period of time, La Réole was the second most important town of Guyenne, after Bordeaux. Twice during the 17th century in 1678 and 1690, Bordeaux's parliament was exiled to La Réole.

Population

Sights
The church of St Peter, dating from the end of the 12th century as well as the impressive buildings of the 18th century Benedictine monastery are still both in use. The monastery currently houses a museum, library and the offices of the current town hall. There is also an old town hall building that dates from the 12th and 14th centuries. The town fortifications were dismantled in 1629 by order of Richelieu, but remains dating from the 12th and 14th centuries are to be seen, as well as a part of the Château de Quat'Sos, which was begun by Louis VIII of France and completed by Henry II of England. The south-western tower, called "la Thomasse", still looks over the Garonne river.

Other sites of historical significance in the town include the House of Wine and Art (15th century), the hospital chapel (18th century), Briet's Hotel (17th century) as well as a town centre with cobble streets and houses that date back to the 15th century.

Of more recent note is the suspension bridge that links the town centre to the southern bank of the Garonne river. The architect responsible for its design was Gustave Eiffel, at the time a still little known public servant.

The population in 1906 was 3,469. By the year 2000, inhabitants numbered around 4,200.

Economy
According to the Encyclopædia Britannica Eleventh Edition (1911):
The town is the centre of. the district in which the well-known breed of Bazadais cattle is reared. It is an agricultural market and carries on trade in the wine of the region together with liqueur distillery and the manufacture of casks, rope, brooms, etc.

As the 20th century progressed, La Réole played the role of a regional economic centre, second to Bordeaux. More recently, the administrative responsibility has moved to nearby Langon. La Réole now is an important town centre in the Entre deux mers wine region of the Bordeaux classifications and has concentrated on tourism to stimulate the town economy.

Twin towns
La Réole is twinned with:

  Oliveira do Douro, Vila Nova de Gaia, Portugal, since 1992
  Sacile, Italy, since 2000

Sport
La Réole has an International Motorcycle circuit Grasstrack circuit. It has hosted many European Championship meeting as well as the World 1000cc Sidecar Final in 2010.

See also
Communes of the Gironde department

References

 
Brochure issued by the La Réole Office de Tourisme (1995)
Cantegrel, F (1992) Visiter La Réole Bordeaux : Editions Sud Ouest

Communes of Gironde
Guyenne